Historically, Scotland has a long military tradition that predates the Act of Union with England. Its soldiers form part of the armed forces of the United Kingdom, more usually referred to domestically within Britain as the British Armed Forces.

History prior to the Union

Royal Scots Navy

There are mentions in Medieval records of fleets commanded by Scottish kings including William the Lion and Alexander II. The latter took personal command of a large naval force which sailed from the Firth of Clyde and anchored off the island of Kerrera in 1249, intended to transport his army in a campaign against the Kingdom of the Isles, but he died before the campaign could begin. Viking naval power was disrupted by conflicts between the Scandinavian kingdoms, but entered a period of resurgence in the thirteenth century when Norwegian kings began to build some of the largest ships seen in Northern European waters. In 1263 Hakon responded to Alexander III's designs on the Hebrides by personally leading a major fleet of forty vessels, including the Kristsúðin, to the islands, where they were swelled by local allies to as many as 200 ships. Records indicate that Alexander had several large oared ships built at Ayr, but he avoided a sea battle. Defeat on land at the Battle of Largs and winter storms forced the Norwegian fleet to return home, leaving the Scottish crown as the major power in the region and leading to the ceding of the Western Isles to Alexander in 1266.

English naval power was vital to Edward I's successful campaigns in Scotland from 1296, using largely merchant ships from England, Ireland and his allies in the Islands to transport and supply his armies. Part of the reason for Robert I's success was his ability to call on naval forces from the Islands. As a result of the expulsion of the Flemings from England in 1303, he gained the support of a major naval power in the North Sea. The development of naval power allowed Robert to successfully defeat English attempts to capture him in the Highlands and Islands and to blockade major English controlled fortresses at Perth and Stirling, the last forcing Edward II to attempt the relief that resulted at English defeat at Bannockburn in 1314. Scottish naval forces allowed invasions of the Isle of Man in 1313 and 1317 and Ireland in 1315. They were also crucial in the blockade of Berwick, which led to its fall in 1318.

After the establishment of Scottish independence, Robert I turned his attention to building up a Scottish naval capacity. This was largely focused on the west coast, with the Exchequer Rolls of 1326 recording the feudal duties of his vassals in that region to aid him with their vessels and crews. Towards the end of his reign he supervised the building of at least one royal man-of-war near his palace at Cardross on the River Clyde. In the late fourteenth century naval warfare with England was conducted largely by hired Scots, Flemish and French merchantmen and privateers. James I took a greater interest in naval power. After his return to Scotland in 1424, he established a shipbuilding yard at Leith, a house for marine stores, and a workshop. King's ships were built and equipped there to be used for trade as well as war, one of which accompanied him on his expedition to the Islands in 1429. The office of Lord High Admiral was probably founded in this period. In his struggles with his nobles in 1488 James III received assistance from his two warships the Flower and the King's Carvel also known as the Yellow Carvel.

There were various attempts to create royal naval forces in the fifteenth century. James IV put the enterprise on a new footing, founding a harbour at Newhaven and a dockyard at the Pools of Airth. He acquired a total of 38 ships including the Great Michael, at that time, the largest ship in Europe. Scottish ships had some success against privateers, accompanied the king on his expeditions in the islands and intervened in conflicts Scandinavia and the Baltic, but were sold after the Flodden campaign and after 1516 and Scottish naval efforts would rely on privateering captains and hired merchantmen. James V did not share his father's interest in developing a navy and shipbuilding fell behind the Low Countries. Despite truces between England and Scotland there were periodic outbreaks of a guerre de course. James V built a new harbour at Burntisland in 1542. The chief use of naval power in his reign was a series of expeditions to the Isles and France. After the Union of Crowns in 1603 conflict between Scotland and England ended, but Scotland found itself involved in England's foreign policy, opening up Scottish shipping to attack. In 1626 a squadron of three ships were bought and equipped. There were also several marque fleets of privateers. In 1627, the Royal Scots Navy and accompanying contingents of burgh privateers participated in the major expedition to Biscay. The Scots also returned to West Indies and in 1629 took part in the capture of Quebec.

During the Bishop's Wars the king attempted to blockade Scotland and planned amphibious assaults from England on the East coast and from Ireland to the West. Scottish privateers took a number of English prizes. After the Covenanters allied with the English Parliament they established two patrol squadrons for the Atlantic and North Sea coasts, known collectively as the "Scotch Guard". The Scottish navy was unable to withstand the English fleet that accompanied the army led by Cromwell that conquered Scotland in 1649–51 and the Scottish ships and crews were split up among the Commonwealth fleet. Scottish seamen received protection against arbitrary impressment by English men of war, but a fixed quota of conscripts for the Royal Navy was levied from the sea-coast burghs during the second half of the seventeenth century. Royal Navy patrols were now found in Scottish waters even in peacetime. In the Second (1665–67) and Third Anglo-Dutch Wars (1672–74) between 80 and 120 captains, took Scottish letters of marque and privateers played a major part in the naval conflict. In the 1690s a small fleet of five ships was established by merchants for the Darien Scheme, and a professional navy was established for the protection of commerce in home waters during the Nine Years' War, with three purpose-built warships bought from English shipbuilders in 1696. After the Act of Union in 1707, these vessels were transferred to the Royal Navy.

Scottish armies

Before the Wars of the Three Kingdoms in 1644, there was no standing army in the Kingdom of Scotland. In the Early Middle Ages war in Scotland was characterised by the use of small war-bands of household troops often engaging in raids and low level warfare. By the High Middle Ages, the kings of Scotland could command forces of tens of thousands of men for short periods as part of the "common army", mainly of poorly armoured spear and bowmen. After the "Davidian Revolution" of the 12th century, which introduced elements of feudalism to Scotland, these forces were augmented by small numbers of mounted and heavily armoured knights. These armies rarely managed to stand up to the usually larger and more professional armies produced by England, but they were used to good effect by Robert I of Scotland at Battle of Bannockburn in 1314 to secure Scottish independence. After the Wars of Scottish Independence, the Auld Alliance between Scotland and France played a large part in the country's military activities, especially during the Hundred Years' War. In the Late Middle Ages under the Stewart kings forces were further augmented by specialist troops, particularly men-at-arms and archers, hired by bonds of manrent, similar to English indentures of the same period. Archers became much sought after as mercenaries in French armies of the 15th century in order to help counter the English superiority in this arm, becoming a major element of the French royal guards as the Garde Écossaise. The Stewarts also adopted major innovations in continental warfare, such as longer pikes and the extensive use of artillery. However, in the early 16th century one of the best armed and largest Scottish armies ever assembled still met with defeat at the hands of an English army at the Battle of Flodden in 1513, which saw the destruction of a large number of ordinary troops, a large section of the nobility and the king James IV.

In the sixteenth century the crown took an increasing role in the supply of military equipment. The pike began to replace the spear and the Scots began to convert from the bow to gunpowder firearms. The feudal heavy cavalry had begun to disappear from Scottish armies and the Scots fielded relatively large numbers of light horse, often drawn from the borders. James IV brought in experts from France, Germany and the Netherlands and established a gun foundry in 1511. A clan leader like John Grant of Freuchie in 1596 could muster from his kin, friends, and servants 500 men able to fight for King James and the Sheriff of Moray. Of these 40 had habergeons, two handled swords, and helmets, and another 40 were armed "according to the Highland custom" with  bows, helmets, swords, and targes.

In the early seventeenth century relatively large numbers of Scots took service in foreign armies involved in the Thirty Years' War. As armed conflict with Charles I in the Bishop's Wars became likely, hundreds of Scots mercenaries returned home from foreign service, including experienced leaders like Alexander and David Leslie and these veterans played an important role in training recruits. These systems would form the basis of the Covenanter armies that intervened in the Civil Wars in England and Ireland. Scottish infantry were generally armed, as was almost universal in Western Europe, with a combination of pike and shot. Scottish armies may also have had individuals with a variety of weapons including bows, Lochaber axes, and halberds. Most cavalry were probably equipped with pistols and swords, although there is some evidence that they included lancers. Royalist armies, like those led by James Graham, Marquis of Montrose (1643–44) and in Glencairn's rising (1653–54), were mainly composed of conventionally armed infantry with pike and shot. Montrose's forces were short of heavy artillery suitable for siege warfare and had only a small force of cavalry.

At the Restoration the Privy Council established a force of several infantry regiments and a few troops of horse and there were attempts to found a national militia on the English model. The standing army was mainly employed in the suppression of Covenanter rebellions and the guerrilla war undertaken by the Cameronians in the East. Pikemen became less important in the late seventeenth century and after the introduction of the socket bayonet disappeared altogether, while matchlock muskets were replaced by the more reliable flintlock. On the eve of the Glorious Revolution the standing army in Scotland was about 3,000 men in various regiments and another 268 veterans in the major garrison towns. After the Glorious Revolution the Scots were drawn into King William II's continental wars, beginning with the Nine Years' War in Flanders (1689–97). By the time of the Act of Union, the Kingdom of Scotland had a standing army of seven units of infantry, two of horse and one troop of Horse Guards, besides varying levels of fortress artillery in the garrison castles of Edinburgh, Dumbarton, and Stirling.

Wars and battles to 1707

Scottish–Norwegian War
Battle of Largs
Wars of Scottish Independence
First War of Scottish Independence
Battle of Dunbar
Battle of Stirling Bridge
Battle of Falkirk
Battle of Bannockburn
Second War of Scottish Independence
Battle of Halidon Hill
Battle of Nesbit Moor
Anglo-Scottish Wars
Battle of Otterburn
Battle of Nesbit Moor
War of the League of Cambrai
Battle of Flodden
Rough Wooing
Battle of Ancrum Moor
Battle of Pinkie
Siege of Haddington
Marian civil war
Battle of Langside
Lang Siege
Wars of the Three Kingdoms
Bishops' Wars
Irish Confederate Wars
First English Civil War
Second English Civil War
Battle of Preston
Third English Civil War
Battle of Dunbar
Battle of Worcester
Jacobite risings
Jacobite rising (1689–92)
Battle of Killiecrankie

Castles

Castles arrived in Scotland with the introduction of feudalism in the twelfth century. Initially these were wooden motte-and-bailey constructions, but many were replaced by stone castles with a high curtain wall. During the Wars of Independence, Robert the Bruce pursued a policy of castle slighting. In the late Middle Ages new castles were built, some on a grander scale as "livery and maintenance" castles that could support a large garrison. Gunpowder weaponry led to the use of gun ports, platforms to mount guns and walls adapted to resist bombardment.

Many of the late Medieval castles built in the borders were in the form of tower houses, smaller pele towers or simpler bastle houses. From the fifteenth century there was a phase of Renaissance palace building, which restructured them as castle-type palaces, beginning at Linlithgow. Elements of Medieval castles, royal palaces and tower houses were used in the construction of Scots baronial estate houses, which were built largely for comfort, but with a castle-like appearance. In the seventeenth and eighteenth centuries the military significance of castles declined, but they increasingly became tourist attractions. Elements of the Scots Baronial style would be revived from the late eighteenth century and the trend would be confirmed in popularity by the rebuilding of Balmoral Castle in the nineteenth century and its adoption as a retreat by Queen Victoria. In the twentieth century there were only isolated examples of new castle-influenced houses.

Part of the British Armed Forces

After the Act of Union in 1707, the Scottish Army and Navy merged with those of England. The new British Army incorporated existing Scottish regiments, such as the Scots Guards (Marquis of Argyll's Royal Regiment), The Royal Scots 1st of Foot (Royal Regiment of Foot), King's Own Scottish Borderers 25th of Foot (Leven's Regiment), The 26th (Cameronian) Regiment of Foot (The Earl of Angus's Regiment), Scots Greys (Scots Dragoons) and the Royal Scots Fusiliers 21st of Foot (Earl of Mar's Regiment of Foot). The three vessels of the small Royal Scottish Navy were transferred to the Royal Navy (Royal William, a fifth-rate 32-gun frigate, became HMS Edinburgh; Royal Mary, a sixth-rate 24 gun frigate, became HMS Glasgow; Dumbarton Castle, a sixth-rate frigate, became HMS Dumbarton Castle). The new Armed Forces were controlled by the War Office and Admiralty from London. From the mid-eighteenth century the British Army began to recruit relatively large numbers of Highlanders. The first official Highland regiment to be raised for the British army was the Black Watch in 1740, but the growth of Highland regiments was delayed by the 1745 Jacobite Rebellion. During this period, Scottish soldiers and sailors were instrumental in supporting the expansion of the British Empire and became involved in many international conflicts. These included the War of the Spanish Succession (1702–13), the Quadruple Alliance (1718–20), the War of the Austrian Succession (1740–48), the Seven Years' War (1756–63) and the American Wars of Independence (1775–83).

Napoleonic Wars
Scots had a notable influence in warfare during this period. Prominent sailors of the era included:

Admiral Sir Charles (John) Napier.
Admiral Adam Duncan, 1st Viscount Duncan of Camperdown, led the Royal Navy fleet that defeated the Dutch at the Battle of Camperdown on 11 October 1797.
Admiral Thomas Cochrane, 10th Earl of Dundonald, was one of the most daring and successful captains of the Napoleonic Wars, leading the French to nickname him "le loup de mer" ("the sea wolf"). After being dismissed from the Royal Navy, he served in the rebel navies of Chile, Brazil and Greece during their wars of independence, before being reinstated as an admiral in the Royal Navy. His life and exploits were one of the inspirations for the twentieth-century novelists C. S. Forester's Horatio Hornblower and Patrick O'Brian's Jack Aubrey.
Lieutenant-general Sir John Moore.
Alexander Abercromby.
Thomas Graham, 1st Baron Lynedoch.
George Ramsay, 9th Earl of Dalhousie.
Robert Craufurd.
John Hope, 4th Earl of Hopetoun

Victorian & Colonial Warfare

First World War

Field Marshal Sir Douglas Haig led the British Army on the Western Front from 1915, and oversaw some of the largest and bloodiest episodes of the war. Battles included the Somme(1916) Ypres (1917) Cambrai (1917) Amiens (1918) and Arras (1918) Due to the kilts worn by the Scottish soldiers on the World War I battlefront, their German enemies called them the "ladies from hell". Haig founded the Earl Haig Poppy Fund, for ex-servicemen in the aftermath.

According to the historian T C Smout, "It is still not known how many Scots died in the war. One well-argued estimate put the figure at 110,000, equivalent to about 10 percent of the Scottish male population aged between sixteen and fifty, and probably to about 15 per cent of total British war dead — the sacrifice was higher in proportionate terms than for any other country in the Empire."

Second World War
Scottish soldiers fought in many battles in World War II, in both the Pacific and European theatres.

The Cold War & The End of Empire

Defence establishments in Scotland

Army
In the wake of the Jacobite risings, several fortresses were built throughout the Highlands in the 18th century by General Wade in order to pacify the region, including Fort George, Fort Augustus and Fort William. The Ordnance Survey was also commissioned to map the region. Later, due to their topography and perceived remoteness, parts of Scotland have housed many sensitive defence establishments, some controversial. During World War II, Allied and British Commandos trained at Achnacarry in the Highlands and the island of Gruinard was used for an exercise in biological warfare. Regular British Army Garrisons currently operational in Scotland are: Fort George near Inverness; Redford Barracks and Dreghorn Barracks in Edinburgh; and Glencorse Barracks at Penicuik.

Royal Naval
Between 1960 and 1991, the Holy Loch was a base for the US Navy's fleet of Polaris-armed  ballistic missile submarines. Since the decommissioning of free-falling bombs in 1998, the Trident SLBM system is the UK's only nuclear deterrent. HMS Caledonia at Rosyth in Fife is the support base for navy operations in Scotland and also serves as the Naval Regional Office (NRO Scotland and Northern Ireland). The Royal Navy's LR5 and Submarine Rescue Service is based in Renfrew, near Glasgow. The Royal Navy's submarine nuclear reactor development establishment, is located at Vulcan NTRE, adjacent to Dounreay, which was the site of the UK's fast breeder nuclear reactor programme. RM Condor at Arbroath, Angus is home to 45 Commando, Royal Marines, part of 3 Commando Brigade. Also, the Fleet Protection Group Royal Marines is based at HMNB Clyde.

Since 1999, the Scottish Government has had devolved responsibility over fisheries protection duties in Scotland's exclusive economic zone, carried out by the Scottish Fisheries Protection Agency, which consists of a fleet of four offshore patrol vessels and two Cessna 406 maritime patrol aircraft.

Royal Air Force
A single front-line Royal Air Force station is located in Scotland. RAF Lossiemouth, located in Moray, is the RAF's northern QRA(I) base, supported by four squadrons of Typhoons.

Military Training Areas
The only open air live depleted uranium weapons test range in the British Isles is located near Dundrennan.  As a result, over 7000 weakly radioactive munitions lie on the seabed of the Solway Firth. In 2007, the MoD land holdings in Scotland (owned, leased or with legal rights) was 1,153 km2 representing 31.5% of the MoD's British estate. Prominent Training Areas include Garelochhead, Cape Wrath, Barry Buddon, The Army Selection and Development Center in Penicuik, and Castlelaw in the Pentland Hills.

Industry

Defence contractors and related companies employ around 30,000 people in Scotland and form an important part of the economy. The principal companies operating in the country include: BAE Systems, Rolls-Royce, Raytheon, Thales and Babcock.

Royal Navy bases in Scotland
HMNB Clyde (HMS Neptune), Argyll and Bute
Rosyth Dockyard (HMS Caledonia), Fife
DM Beith, Beith, North Ayrshire
RM Condor formerly HMS Condor, Arbroath, Angus
Loch Ewe

Former Royal Navy bases in Scotland
 Scapa Flow, Orkney
 Invergordon, Easter Ross
 Port Edgar, South Queensferry, City of Edinburgh
 , Rosyth
 Port HHZ, Loch a' Chàirn Bhàin, Kylesku, Sutherland, Highland
 HMS Columbine, Royal Navy  Destroyer Depot. Based at  Port Edgar 1917–1938
 HMS Curlew, Inellan, Dunoon, Argyll & Bute Harbour Defence Depot
 HMS Dundonald, Troon, Combined Operations Craft Working up base
 HMS Hopetoun, Combined Operations Training Centre. Based at Port Edgar 1943–1945
 . Minesweeping & Fisheries Protection Depot. Based at Port Edgar 1939–1943 and 1946–1975. Based at Granton 1943–1946
 HMS Quebec, Inverary, Argyll & Bute, Combined Operations Craft Working up base
 , Port Bannatyne, Argyll & Bute, Midget submarine training shore base
 HMS Western Isles, Tobermory, Argyll & Bute, Anti-submarine working up base

Former Royal Naval Air Stations in Scotland
, Arbroath, Angus
, Evanton, Ross and Cromarty, Highland
, Lossiemouth, Moray
, Prestwick, South Ayrshire
, Crail, Fife
HMS Landrail, Macrihanish, Argyll and Bute
, Rattray, Aberdeenshire
, Donibristle, Fife
HMS Nighthawk, Drem, East Lothian
, Fearn, Wester Ross, Highland
, East Haven, Angus
, Grimsetter, Kirkwall, Orkney
, Abbotsinch, Renfrewshire:  (Now Glasgow International Airport)
HMS Sparrowhawk, Hatston, Orkney
HMS Tern, Twatt, Orkney
, Heathfield, Ayr, South Ayrshire

Royal Air Force stations in Scotland

RAF Benbecula
RAF Kirknewton
RAF Lossiemouth
RAF Tain

Former Royal Air Force stations in Scotland

RAF Alness
RAF Annan
RAF Balado Bridge
RAF Banff
RAF Bishopbriggs
RAF Black Isle
RAF Bowmore
RAF Brackla
RAF Buchan
RAF Buttergask (11 EFTS)
RAF Castle Kennedy
RAF Castletown
RAF Charterhall
RAF Connel (244 MU)
RAF Dalcross
RAF Dallachy
RAF Dornoch
RAF Drem
RAF Dumfries
RAF Dundonald
RAF Dunino
RAF Dyce
RAF East Fortune
RAF Edzell
RAF Elgin
RAF Errol

RAF Fordoun
RAF Forres
RAF Fraserburgh
RAF Gailes
RAF Grangemouth
RAF Greenock
RAF Helensburgh (MAEE)
RAF Inverness
RAF Isbister Bay?
RAF Kidsdale (Burrow Head) (No. 651 Sqn)
RAF Kinloss
RAF Kirkandrews (No. 15 EFTS)
RAF Kirkpatrick (No. 15 EFTS)
RAF Kirkton
RAF Kirkwall?
RAF Largs (No. 231 Sqn)
RAF Leanach
RAF Lennoxlove
RAF Lerwick
RAF Leuchars
RAF Lossiemouth
RAF Low Eldrig
RAF Machrihanish
RAF Milltown
RAF Montrose
RAF Oban

RAF Perth
RAF Peterhead
RAF Portellon?
RAF Prestwick
RAF Renfrew
RAF Saxa Vord
RAF Skatsa?
RAF Skeabrae
RAF Skitten
RAF Stornoway
RAF Stravithie
RAF Sullom Voe
RAF Sumburgh
RAF Tealing
RAF Tiree
RAF Turnberry
RAF Turnhouse
RAF West Freugh
RAF Whitefield (No 11 EFTS/No 5 FIS)
RAF Wick
RAF Windyhead?
RAF Wigtown
RAF Winterseugh
RAF Woodhaven (No. 201 Sqn/No. 333 Sqn/No. 1477 (Norwegian) Flight)

Scottish Units in the British Army

Previously within the British Army, the Scottish Infantry comprised a number of 'county regiments', each recruiting from a local area. In 2006, the remaining regiments, known collectively as the Scottish Division, were amalgamated to form the Royal Regiment of Scotland. The amalgamation was vigorously opposed by veterans and supporters of the old regiments. Scottish soldiers serve nationally alongside soldiers from England, Wales and Northern Ireland in all Combat Support Arms and Services (RA, RE, Signals, Intelligence, AAC, RLC, AGC, REME and AMS), Special Forces, the Household Cavalry and the Parachute Regiment of the British Army, with the following current Formations and Units having specific Scottish connections:

51 (Scottish) Brigade
52 Infantry Brigade
Royal Regiment of Scotland
Scots Guards
Royal Scots Dragoon Guards
1st Royal Tank Regiment
19th Regiment Royal Artillery
40th Regiment Royal Artillery
A (London Scottish) Company London Regiment
105th Regiment Royal Artillery
32 (Scottish) Signal Regiment
154 (Scottish) Regiment RLC
 A (Ayrshire (Earl of Carrick's Own) Yeomanry) & C (Fife and Forfar Yeomanry/Scottish Horse) Squadrons of the Queen's Own Yeomanry Regiment

Former Scottish Units in the British Army
9th (Scottish) Division
15th (Scottish) Division
51st (Highland) Division
52nd (Lowland) Division
Highland Brigade
Lowland Brigade
4th Royal Tank Regiment
The Cameronians (Scottish Rifles)
Glasgow Highlanders
The Gordon Highlanders
Highland Light Infantry
Liverpool Scottish
London Scottish
King's Own Scottish Borderers
Queen's Own Cameron Highlanders
Queen's Own Highlanders (Seaforth and Camerons)
The Royal Scots
Royal Scots Fusiliers
Scots Greys
Seaforth Highlanders
93rd (Sutherland) Highlanders

Regular British Army Units currently based in Scotland
The Royal Highland Fusiliers, 2nd Battalion The Royal Regiment of Scotland – Glencorse Barracks
The Black Watch, 3rd Battalion The Royal Regiment of Scotland – Fort George
3rd Battalion, The Rifles – Redford Barracks
Balaklava Company (Argylls) 5th Battalion The Royal Regiment of Scotland – Redford Barracks Edinburgh
39 Engineer Regiment (Kinloss Barracks)
Royal Scots Dragoon Guards (Leuchars Station)

Scottish units that are not part of the British Army
Atholl Highlanders
Royal Company of Archers
High Constables of Holyroodhouse

Scottish regiments in other countries

Australia

List of active regiments in the Australian Army:

 5th/6th Battalion, Royal Victoria Regiment (Victorian Scottish Regiment)
 10th/27th Battalion, Royal South Australia Regiment (South Australian Scottish Regiment)
 16th Battalion, Royal Western Australia Regiment (Cameron Highlanders)
 41st Battalion, Royal New South Wales Regiment (Byron Scottish Regiment)

List of former Scottish regiments in Australia:

 30th Battalion (The New South Wales Scottish Regiment)
 61st Battalion (The Queensland Cameron Highlanders)

List of former Scottish regiments in the Australian colonial forces:
 Byron Regiment (Sutherland)
 New South Wales Scottish Regiment
 South Australian Scottish Regiment
 Victorian Scottish Regiment (VSR)

Canada

List of active regiments in the Canadian Forces:

 42nd Field Artillery Regiment (Lanark and Renfrew Scottish), RCA
 48th Highlanders of Canada 1891
 The Argyll and Sutherland Highlanders of Canada (Princess Louise's) 1903
 The Black Watch (Royal Highland Regiment) of Canada 1862
 Cape Breton Highlanders 1871–1954 2011-present
 The Calgary Highlanders 1910
 The Cameron Highlanders of Ottawa (Duke of Edinburgh's Own) 1881
 The Canadian Scottish Regiment (Princess Mary's) 1912
 The Essex and Kent Scottish 1954
 The Lake Superior Scottish Regiment 1905
 The Lorne Scots (Peel, Dufferin and Halton Regiment) 1866
 The Nova Scotia Highlanders 1871
 The Queen's Own Cameron Highlanders of Canada 1910
 The Royal Highland Fusiliers of Canada late 1940s
 The Seaforth Highlanders of Canada 1910
 The Stormont, Dundas and Glengarry Highlanders 1804
 The Toronto Scottish Regiment (Queen Elizabeth The Queen Mother's Own) 1920

Defunct Scottish regiments, many merged to former larger regiments:

 The Essex Scottish Regiment 1885–1954 – merged into The Essex and Kent Scottish
 The Pictou Highlanders 1871–1954, Cape Breton Highlanders 1871–1954 and The North Nova Scotia Highlanders – 1936–1954 merged to form The Nova Scotia Highlanders
 Highland Light Infantry of Canada 1886–1954 – merged into The Perth and Waterloo Regiment (Highland Light Infantry of Canada)
 The New Brunswick Scottish 1946–1954 – merged into The Royal New Brunswick Regiment
 16th Canadian Battalion (The Canadian Scottish), CEF 1914–1920 – disbanded
 The 13th Scottish Light Dragoons 1872–1936 – disbanded
 Lorne Rifles (Scottish) – became The Lorne Scots (Peel, Dufferin and Halton Regiment)
 Cameronians Regiment of Foot
 Glengarry Fencibles, Glengarry Light Infantry

France

Inactive regiments of the French Army:

 Garde Écossaise 1418–1830
 Gens d'Armes Ecossais (Scots Men-At-Arms) – formed 1419 and dissolved 1791

South Africa

There are three regiments in the South African Defence Force with Scottish roots:

 Pretoria Highlanders 1939
 Transvaal Scottish Regiment 1902
 Cape Town Highlanders Regiment 1885

New Zealand

New Zealand Scots Regiment (1st NZ Scottish Regiment and 1st Armoured Car Regiment) was raised in 1939 and renamed 1990 as New Zealand Scottish and disbanded amongst other units:
1st Royal New Zealand Armoured Regiment of the Royal New Zealand Armoured Corps

See also

Nemo me impune lacessit
Scottish National War Memorial
National War Museum of Scotland
Army School of Bagpipe Music and Highland Drumming
Claymore
Schiltron
Tam o'Shanter
Earl Haig Fund Scotland
Edinburgh Military Tattoo
Highland charge
Lord High Constable of Scotland
Scottish Militia Bill 1708
The Poker Club
Garde du Corps
The Thin Red Line (1854 battle)
Scottish regiment
Scottish War Memorials
Munitions production:
HM Factory, Gretna
Nobel Industries (Scotland)
ROF Bishopton
ROF Dalmuir

References

Further reading
 Dziennik, Matthew. "Fatal land: war, empire, and the Highland soldier in British America, 1756–1783." (PhD dissertation, University of Edinburgh, 2011). Online, With detailed bibliography
 Henshaw, Victoria. Scotland and the British Army, 1700–1750: Defending the Union (Bloomsbury Publishing, 2014)
 Kenyon, John, and Jane Ohlmeyer. The British and Irish Civil Wars: A Military History of Scotland, Ireland, and England, 1638–1660 (1998).
 Konstam, Angus, and Peter Dennis. Strongholds of the Picts: The fortifications of Dark Age Scotland (2013)
 Murdoch, Steve, and A. Mackillop. Fighting for Identity: Scottish Military Experience C. 1550–1900 (2003)
 Peters, David. Scotland's Military History (2013)
 Phillips, Gervase. The Anglo-Scots Wars, 1513–1550: A Military History (1999)
 Scobie, Ian Hamilton Mackay, ed. The Scottish regiments of the British army (Oliver and Boyd, 1942)
 Spiers, Edward M.  and Jeremy A. Crang. A Military History of Scotland (2014)
 Spiers, Edward M. The Scottish Soldier and Empire, 1854–1902 (Edinburgh University Press, 2006).
Watt, Patrick. 2019. " Manpower, Myth and Memory: Analysing Scotland's Military Contribution to the Great War." Journal of Scottish Historical Studies 39.1, 2019, 75–100
Wood, Stephen. The Scottish Soldier: An illustrated social and military history of Scotland's fighting men through two thousand years (1999)

External links
National War Museum of Scotland, National Museums of Scotland
Military Collection, Historic Scotland
Military Records, National Archives of Scotland
Military Records, Scottish Archive Network
Scots at War Trust, Fettes College
Regimental Page, Fettes College
Scottish War Memorials Forum (public access forum recording all of Scotland's War Memorials)
Scottish Military Research Group
Scottish Military History Website
Scottish Military History Website
 Quick Guide to Scottish Regiments

 
 
Highland regiments
Scottish regiments